Olin Hatfield "Chilly" Chilson (November 22, 1903 – September 28, 1991) was a United States district judge of the United States District Court for the District of Colorado.

Education and career
Born on November 22, 1903, in Pueblo, Colorado, Chilson received a Bachelor of Laws in 1927 from the University of Colorado Law School. At Colorado, he played college football as a quarterback and was captain of the 1925 Colorado Silver and Gold football team. He was also captain of the basketball and baseball teams at Colorado.

Chilson entered private practice in La Jara, Colorado in 1927, practicing in Greeley, from 1927 to 1928, and in Loveland, from 1928 to 1954. He was a district attorney for the Eighth Judicial District of Colorado from 1940 to 1948. He was an Assistant Secretary of the United States Department of the Interior from 1956 to 1957. He was Undersecretary of the United States Department of the Interior from 1957 to 1958. He returned to private practice in Denver, Colorado from 1958 to 1960.

Federal judicial service
Chilson was nominated by President Dwight D. Eisenhower on February 19, 1960, to a seat on the United States District Court for the District of Colorado vacated by Judge William Lee Knous. He was confirmed by the United States Senate on March 1, 1960, and received his commission on March 5, 1960. He was a member of the Judicial Conference of the United States from 1970 to 1973. He assumed senior status on December 31, 1973. His service terminated on September 28, 1991, due to his death.

References

1903 births
1991 deaths
20th-century American judges
American football quarterbacks
Colorado Buffaloes baseball players
Colorado Buffaloes football players
Colorado Buffaloes men's basketball players
District attorneys in Colorado
Judges of the United States District Court for the District of Colorado
United States district court judges appointed by Dwight D. Eisenhower
United States Department of the Interior officials
University of Colorado Law School alumni
Sportspeople from Pueblo, Colorado
Players of American football from Colorado
Baseball players from Colorado
Basketball players from Colorado